East Wenatchee is a city in Douglas County, Washington, United States.  The population at the 2010 census was 13,190, a 129.1% increase on the 2000 census, having annexed much of the East Wenatchee Bench CDP. As of 2019, the Office of Financial Management estimates that the current population was 14,219.

East Wenatchee lies on the east shore of the Columbia River, opposite Wenatchee on the west shore. On November 10, 2002, East Wenatchee was designated a principal city of the Wenatchee – East Wenatchee Metropolitan Statistical Area by the Office of Management and Budget.

History
At the turn of the 20th Century irrigation projects, including the Columbia Basin Project east of the region, fostered the development of intensive agriculture in the shrub-steppe native to the region. Fruit orchards become one of the area's leading industries.

In 1908, the first highway bridge to span the Columbia River opened.  The privately owned bridge carried people, horses, wagons, and automobiles; it also supported two large water pipelines along its sides.  It connected Chelan County on the west (Wenatchee) shore with Douglas County on the East Wenatchee shore.  The bridge opened East Wenatchee and the rest of Douglas County to apple orchard development.  Still standing today, the bridge is a  pin-connected steel cantilever bridge and cost $177,000 to build. It once carried Sunset Highway (State Highway 2) across the river.

The bridge was the brainchild of W. T. Clark, one of the builders of the Highline Canal, a major irrigation project to water the apple orchards in the valley. It was financed in part by James J. Hill (1838–1916), of the Great Northern Railway (which arrived in Wenatchee in 1892). In its second year of operation the canal firm that owned it decided to start charging tolls.

This prompted local leaders to hasten to the state legislature to persuade the state to purchase the bridge as part of the state highway system. The state purchased the bridge despite the state-employed consultant's opinion "that the ugliness of the structure is very apparent" (Dorpat), despite defects in the timber floor and concrete piers, and despite leaks in the waterpipes.

The structure remained in full use until 1950 when the George Sellar bridge was built.  Today, it remains as a footbridge on the Apple Capital Recreation Loop Trail and still has the old pipeline running across it.

From its foundation in agriculture, the region's economy has diversified to include year-round tourism and a variety of other industries.

Founding
On February 28, 1935, citizens voted, 48 in favor and 46 against, to incorporate the town of East Wenatchee. Through subsequent annexations, the town has grown into a city. Today, East Wenatchee's boundaries encompass .

Landing of first trans-pacific airplane flight
On October 5, 1931, East Wenatchee became part of aviation history.  Having taken off from Misawa, Japan, pilots Clyde Pangborn and Hugh Herndon Jr. safely belly-landed their Bellanca airplane, Miss Veedol, on a nearby airstrip known then as Fancher Field. After take off, the pilots intentionally jettisoned the landing gear to conserve fuel.  This flight was the first nonstop flight across the Pacific Ocean.  In honor of this pioneering flight, East Wenatchee's airport is called Pangborn Memorial Airport, the Pangborn-Herndon Memorial Site, listed on the National Register of Historic Places, is nearby, and Miss Veedols propeller is displayed in the Wenatchee Valley Museum & Cultural Center.

Clovis points discovery
On May 27, 1987, East Wenatchee became part of archaeological history. On that date, while digging in an orchard just east of the city, farmworkers accidentally discovered a cache of 11,000-year-old Clovis points and other artifacts, left there by Pleistocene hunters. The East Wenatchee Clovis Site, explored in two subsequent archaeological digs in 1988 and 1990, was closed to science by the landowner after protests by local Native American tribes. The legal moratorium on new archaeological work at the site ended on June 1, 2007.

Other
On January 8, 2007, East Wenatchee had a devastating wind storm with 100 MPH plus winds. The storm caused thousands of dollars worth of damage to homes, businesses, and city parks and many people went without power for days and even weeks.

East Wenatchee was also home to the only public school named after General Robert E. Lee in Washington State.  The Robert E. Lee Elementary School (1955) and the school district rejected a name change in 2015 and again in August 2017. The school district voted to change the name from Robert E. Lee Elementary School to Lee Elementary School in 2018.

Geography
East Wenatchee is located at  (47.421506, -120.288094).

Climate

Agriculture

There are many orchards surrounding East Wenatchee. Commercial crops primarily include apples, sweet cherries and pears. Apricots, peaches, nectarines, and plums are also grown.

Wheat and other grain are also grown on farms in the outlying areas near East Wenatchee.

Nearby entertainment and recreation
Activities in East Wenatchee or the nearby city of Wenatchee include:
 Alpine Skiing (Mission Ridge, Stevens Pass)
 Cinemas (Liberty and Gateway 11)
 Walking or Cycling Paved Trails (Apple Capital Loop Trail)
 Shopping (malls, outlets, boutique shops, downtown)
 Boating, Water skiing, Wake boarding (Columbia River)
 Hiking (trails and area parks, including the Apple Capital Recreation Loop Trail)
 Kayaking, Rafting (Columbia or Wenatchee rivers)
 Bowling (Eastmont Lanes)
 Hockey (Wenatchee Wild at the Town Toyota Center)
 Wenatchee AppleSox Semi-Professional Baseball (Wenatchee)
 Go Karting (Revolution Go Karts, seasonal at the Wenatchee Valley Mall)
 Carnivals - Apple Blossom Festival (April), Wings and Wheels Festival (First Weekend of October)
 Fishing (Columbia or Wenatchee rivers)
 Parks (Confluence, Hydro, Walla Walla, Lincoln, all parks by the water)

Culture

Community events
Wenatchee Valley's Super Oval

Apple Blossom Festival

Wings & Wheels

On the first weekend of October, the City hosts an annual Wings and Wheels Festival to commemorate Clyde Pangborn's historic non-stop flight across the Pacific Ocean.

Classy Chassis Parade & Car Show

Demographics

As of 2000 the median income for a household in the city was $34,919, and the median income for a family was $41,518. Males had a median income of $37,629 versus $24,875 for females. The per capita income for the city was $17,876.  16.5% of the population and 13.4% of families were below the poverty line. Out of the total people living in poverty, 28.6% were under the age of 18 and 4.2% were 65 or older.

2010 census
As of the census of 2010, there were 13,190 people, 4,997 households, and 3,517 families residing in the city. The racial makeup of the city was 80.1% White, 0.3% African American, 1.2% Native American, 0.9% Asian, 0.1% Pacific Islander, 14.0% from other races, and 3.4% from two or more races. Hispanic or Latino of any race were 23.4% of the population.

There were 4,997 households, of which 36.5% had children under the age of 18 living with them, 50.4% were married couples living together, 14.3% had a female householder with no husband present, 5.6% had a male householder with no wife present, and 29.6% were non-families. 22.9% of all households were made up of individuals, and 9% had someone living alone who was 65 years of age or older. The average household size was 2.63 and the average family size was 3.08.

The median age in the city was 35.2 years. 26.4% of residents were under the age of 18; 9.9% were between the ages of 18 and 24; 24.9% were from 25 to 44; 24.5% were from 45 to 64; and 14.2% were 65 years of age or older. The gender makeup of the city was 48.4% male and 51.6% female.

Shopping
The area's major shopping centers are Wenatchee Valley Mall and Valley North Mall.

Government and politics

The City of East Wenatchee has a mayor–council government. The City Council consists of seven members. The Mayor presides at City Council meetings and acts as the city's executive officer.

Education
Public K-12 education is provided by the Eastmont School District #206.

Schools:

 Cascade Elementary
 Grant Elementary
 Kenroy Elementary
 Lee Elementary
 Rock Island Elementary
 Clovis Intermediate School
 Sterling Junior High School
 Eastmont Junior High School
 Eastmont High School

Transportation

Bus
Link Transit provides public transportation throughout the Wenatchee valley including routes that connect the cities of Wenatchee and East Wenatchee with Leavenworth, Chelan, and Waterville.

Air
The city is served by Pangborn Memorial Airport with daily flights to Seattle–Tacoma International Airport provided by Alaska Airlines.

Roads and highways
East Wenatchee is serviced by State Route 28, State Route 285, U.S. Route 97, and U.S. Route 2.

Notable people 
 Clyde Ballard, politician and former state representative
 Cary Condotta, politician and former state representative
 Brad Hawkins, politician
 Karla Wilson, politician and former state representative

Sister cities
East Wenatchee has one sister city:
  Misawa, Aomori Prefecture, Japan

References

External links
 
 Apple Capital Loop Trail
 Casts of East Wenatchee Clovis Points

Cities in Washington (state)
Cities in Douglas County, Washington
Wenatchee–East Wenatchee metropolitan area
Washington (state) populated places on the Columbia River